Pixar Short Films Collection may refer to:

Pixar Short Films Collection, Volume 1
Pixar Short Films Collection, Volume 2
Pixar Short Films Collection, Volume 3